In astronomy, an Odd Radio Circle (ORC) is a very large, (Over 50 thousand times the diameter of our very own Milky Way ~ 3 Million Light-years) unexplained astronomical object that, at radio wavelengths, is highly circular and brighter along its edges.  As of 27 April 2021, there have been five such objects (and possibly six more) observed. The observed ORCs are bright at radio wavelengths, but are not visible at visible, infrared or X-ray wavelengths. This is due to the physical process producing this radiation, which is thought to be synchrotron radiation. Three of the ORCs contain optical galaxies in their centers, suggesting that the galaxies might have formed these objects.

Description 

The ORCs were detected in late 2019 after astronomer Anna Kapinska studied a Pilot Survey of the Evolutionary Map of the Universe (EMU), based on  the Australian Square Kilometre Array Pathfinder (ASKAP) radio telescope array. All of the ORCs are about 1 arcminute in diameter, and are some distance from the galactic plane, at high galactic latitudes. The possibility of a spherical shock wave, associated with fast radio bursts, gamma-ray bursts, or neutron star mergers, was considered, but, if related, would have to have taken place in the distant past due to the large angular size of the ORCs, according to the researchers. Also, according to the astronomers, "Circular features are well-known in radio astronomical images, and usually represent a spherical object such as a supernova remnant, a planetary nebula, a  circumstellar shell, or a face-on disc such as a protoplanetary disc or a star-forming galaxy, ... They may also arise from imaging artefact around bright sources caused by calibration errors or inadequate deconvolution. This class of circular feature in radio images does not seem to correspond to any of these known types of object or artefact, but rather appears to be a new class of astronomical object."

See also 
 Fast radio burst
 Gamma-ray burst
 Radio lobes of radio galaxies
 Gravitational wave
 Baryon acoustic oscillations

References

External links 
 Images of ORCs (CTA Observatory / Western Sydney University; 04/20/2020)
  (Anton Petrov; 07/15/2020)
  (Mr. Researcher; 07/10/2020)
  (World Today; 07/09/2020)

Astronomical events
Radio astronomy
Stellar phenomena
Unexplained phenomena
Unsolved problems in astronomy
2020 in science